Durasovo is a rural locality (a village) in Butylitskoye Rural Settlement, Melenkovsky District, Vladimir Oblast, Russia. The population was 5 as of 2010.

Geography 
Durasovo is located 36 km north of Melenki (the district's administrative centre) by road. Skripino is the nearest rural locality.

References 

Rural localities in Melenkovsky District